Oreta is a genus of moths belonging to the subfamily Drepaninae. The genus was erected by Francis Walker in 1855.

Species
The rosea species group
Oreta ancora Chu and Wang, 1987
Oreta andrema Wilkinson, 1972
Oreta angularis Watson, 1967
Oreta brunnea Wileman, 1911
Oreta eminens (Bryk, 1943)
Oreta flavobrunnea Watson, 1967
Oreta hoenei Watson, 1967
Oreta liensis Watson, 1967
Oreta loochooana Swinhoe, 1902
Oreta obtusa Walker, 1855
Oreta paki Inoue, 1964
Oreta pavaca Moore, [1866]
Oreta pulchripes Butler, 1877
Oreta rosea (Walker, 1855)
Oreta sanguinea Moore, 1879
Oreta shania Watson, 1967
Oreta speciosa (Bryk, 1943)
Oreta trispina Watson, 1967
Oreta turpis Butler, 1877
Oreta vatama Moore, [1866]
The insignis species group
Oreta ashleyi Holloway, 1998
Oreta bicolor Warren, 1897
Oreta insignis (Butler, 1877)
Oreta perfida Warren, 1923
Oreta perobliquilinea Warren, 1923
Oreta singapura Swinhoe, 1892
Oreta sublustris Warren, 1923
Oreta subvinosa Warren, 1903
Oreta unilinea (Warren, 1899)
The extensa species group
Oreta extensa Walker, 1855
Oreta pingorum Holloway, 1998
Oreta roepkei Watson, 1961
Oreta suffusa Walker, 1855
The fuscopurpurea species group
Oreta fuscopurpurea Inoue, 1956
The carnea species group
Oreta carnea (Butler, 1892)
Oreta griseotincta Hampson, 1893
Oreta identata Watson, 1961
Oreta jaspidea (Warren, 1896)
Oreta rubrifumata Warren, 1923
The rubromarginata species group
Oreta bilineata H.F. Chu & L.Y. Wang, 1987
Oreta fulgens (Warren, 1899)
Oreta rubromarginata Swinhoe, 1902
Oreta sambongsana Park, M. Y. Kim, Y. D. Kwon & E. M. Ji, 2011
unknown species group
Oreta inflativalva Song, Xue & Han, 2012
Oreta miltodes Lower, 1903
Oreta trispinuligera Chen, 1985

Former species
Oreta ankyra Chu & Wang Chu & Wang, 1987
Oreta calida Butler, 1877
Oreta dalia H.F. Chu & L.Y. Wang, 1987
Oreta fusca H.H. Chu & L.Y. Wang, 1987
Oreta hyalina H.H. Chu & L.Y. Wang, 1987
Oreta lushansis Fang
Oreta trianga H.F. Chu & L.Y. Wang, 1987
Oreta unichroma H.H. Chu & L.Y. Wang, 1987
Oreta zigzaga H.F. Chu & L.Y. Wang, 1987

References

 , 1987: Studies on the taxonomy and zoogeography of the Chinese Oretinae (Lepidoptera: Drepanidae). Acta Entomologica Sinica 30 (3): 291–303.
 , 2011: A review of the genus Oreta Walker in Korea, with description of a new species (Lepidoptera: Drepanidae). Journal of Asia-Pacific Entomology 14 (3): 311–316.
 , 2012: Revision of Chinese Oretinae (Lepidoptera, Drepanidae). Zootaxa 3445: 1-36. Abstract: 

Drepaninae
Drepanidae genera
Taxa named by Francis Walker (entomologist)